Truesdel Peck Calkins (October 07, 1877 - June 9, 1942) was an American educator and academic administrator who served as the first President of Hofstra University from 1939 until his death from a heart attack in 1942.

Prior to being Hofstra's president, Calkins had served as New York University's director of the Bureau of Appointments and as a professor of education. His directorship was instrumental of the founding of the university, and he was named chairman of the board of trustees until his election to the presidency. He had also held positions as Principal of the East Springfield Academy, and various superintendent positions, including the village of Hempstead in which Hofstra is situated.

References

New York University alumni
Presidents of Hofstra University
1877 births
1942 deaths
People from Brownville, New York